Nance is a Cornish surname. Notable people with the surname include:

 Albinus Nance (1848–1911), 4th governor of Nebraska
 Eric Nance (1960–2005), American murderer
 Greg Nance, American entrepreneur, mountaineer, and endurance athlete
 Jack Nance (1943–1996), actor
 James J. Nance (1900–1984), president of Studebaker Packard Motor Co.
 Jim Nantz, American sportscaster for CBS Sports
 Jim Nance, professional football player
 John J. Nance, pilot, author
 Kenneth Nance (1941–2013), American politician
 Larry Nance (born 1959), American basketball player
 Larry Nance Jr. (born 1993), son of the above, American basketball player
 Lynn Nance, NCAA Basketball Coach
 Malcolm Wrightson Nance, counter-terrorism intelligence consultant
 J. Milton Nance, historian at Texas A&M University
 Ray Nance, musician
 Robert Morton Nance, Cornish language expert
 Sarafina Nance, American science communicator and astrophysicist 
 Tommy Nance (born 1991), American baseball player
 Walter Nance (born 1933), American medical geneticist

Middle name
 John Nance Garner (1868–1967), United States Vice President

English-language surnames